Cowboy action shooting (CAS, also known as western action shooting, single action shooting, Cowboy 3 Gun, and Western 3-gun) is a competitive shooting sport that originated in Southern California in the early 1980s, at the Coto de Caza Shooting Range in Orange County, California. Cowboy action shooting is now practiced in many places with several sanctioning organizations including the Single Action Shooting Society (SASS), Western Action Shootists Association (WASA), and National Congress of Old West Shooters (NCOWS), Single Action Shooting Australia (SASA), Western 3-Gun as well as others in the U.S. and other countries.

CAS is a type of multigun match utilizing a combination of handgun(s), rifle(s), and/or shotgun(s) in a variety of "Old West-themed" courses of fire for time and accuracy. Participants must dress in appropriate theme or era "costume" as well as use gear and accessories as mandated by the respective sanctioning group rules.

Firearms 

CAS requires competitors to use firearms typical of the mid-to-late 19th century:  single-action revolvers, lever-action rifles chambered in pistol calibers, and side-by-side double-barreled shotguns (also referred to as Coach Guns – with or without external hammers, although automatic ejectors are not allowed), or pump-action shotguns with external hammers (similar to the Winchester 1897). The 1884 Colt Lightning slide-action rifles and Winchester 1887 lever-action shotguns are also allowed in competition. Both original and reproduction guns are equally acceptable. All CAS handguns must be "single-action", meaning that the hammer must be manually cocked before each shot can be fired.

Competition in a CAS match generally requires four guns: two revolvers, a shotgun, and a rifle chambered in a centerfire revolver caliber of a type in use prior to 1899. Some CAS matches also offer side events for single-shot "buffalo rifles", derringers, speed shotgun, and other specialty shooting. Replica firearms are available from companies such as Ruger, Colt, Uberti, Pedersoli, Stoeger, Chiappa, Pietta, Armi San Marco and U.S. Fire Arms Mfg. Co.

Wild Bunch matches 

One variant of CAS currently sanctioned by SASS is The Wild Bunch Action Shooting, inspired by the 1969 Western film. According to SASS, this form uses "firearms typical of those used in the taming of the Old West just after the turn of the 20th century". The revolvers used in normal SASS events are replaced with 1911 pistols; lever-action rifles remain in use, while only 1897-style pump-action shotguns are allowed. As in traditional CAS, originals and replicas are acceptable.

In SASS Wild Bunch matches, pistols must be chambered for .45 ACP, rifles must be chambered for pistol cartridges of .40 caliber or greater, and shotguns must be 12 gauge. All ammunition for pistols or rifles must also meet a minimum power factor of 150, calculated by multiplying the bullet weight in grains and the muzzle velocity in feet per second and then dividing the result by 1000. Additionally, maximum muzzle velocities are limited to 1000 ft/s for pistol ammunition and 1400 ft/s for rifle ammunition.

Costume 

Competitors are required to wear an Old West or Victorian era style outfit and apparel. One exception to this is that safety glasses and hearing protection must be worn when shooting. Depending on the standards of the sanctioning organization, clothing may be historically accurate for the late 19th century or may just be suggestive of the Old West. Some groups allow for costume similar to that worn by characters in a western B-movie, such as Hopalong Cassidy or a television series like Gunsmoke. In SASS-sponsored Wild Bunch shooting, the required dress is military clothing of the early 20th century, Western clothing typical of that time (such as that worn in the film The Wild Bunch) or Mexican period dress.

Alias 

Participants must select an alias out of the Old West or have an "old west flair". Aliases are registered with the sanctioning body so they are unique to the participant. Many find it necessary to be creative in selecting an alias (such as the banker who shoots under the alias "The Loan Arranger") as virtually all historical names such as Wyatt Earp and Butch Cassidy have long since been claimed. Registered names cannot sound the same as another registered name.

Competition 

Competition involves a number of separate shooting scenarios known as "stages".  Stages are always different, each typically requiring ten revolver rounds (shooters generally carry two single-action revolvers), nine or ten rifle rounds, and two to eight shotgun rounds.  Targets typically are steel plates that ring when hit.  Sometimes reactive targets such as steel knockdown plates or clay birds are used. Misses add five seconds to the competitor's time; safety violations and other procedural violations add 10 seconds. Competition is close and contested with the national and world championships attracting over 700 competitors.

Scoring 

Shooters compete one at a time against the clock.  Most matches are scored simply by "total time" minus bonuses and plus penalties. Other matches are scored by Rank Points.

Shooters are timed using electronic timers which record the duration for each stage to one hundredth of a second. The timer starts when the Range Officer pushes the button which beeps to signal that the shooter may proceed. The timer has a built-in microphone and records the time when each loud noise (shot) happens. When there is no more noise, the timer continues to display the final time which is the raw score.

Each shooter's "raw" time for the stage is increased by five seconds for each missed target and ten seconds for any procedural penalty incurred.  The fastest adjusted time wins. Targets shot out of proper order incur a procedural penalty, though only one procedural penalty can be assessed per shooter per stage.

In "Rank Point Scoring" the top shooter of a match is determined by adding up each shooter's ranking for each stage, with the lowest score winning.  For example, if a shooter places first in every stage in a 10-stage match, the shooter's score would be 10 (a 1 for each stage) and would be the lowest score possible.  There is some controversy as to whether "Rank Points" or "Total Time" is a better system. SASS in 2017 moved to Total Time scoring and discarded the Rank Point Scoring system.

Events 

Every stage at a match is intended to be different.  Sometimes only two types of guns are used or perhaps even only one.  Occasionally a shooter is required to reload a firearm while being timed.

When he comes to the line, the shooter will place his guns as required by the stage description. When the competitor steps to the start position, the Range Officer conducting the stage will ask if the shooter understands the course of fire and clarify any questions the shooter may have.  The Range Officer will ask if the shooter is ready, will tell the shooter to "Stand By", and will start the timer within 2 to 5 seconds.  When started, the timer gives an audible electronic tone and the shooter will begin the stage.

An example of a stage might have the shooter draw his first revolver and engage five steel targets then holster his first revolver and move to his left to where his rifle is staged.  He will retrieve his rifle and engage the rifle targets, which are set farther away than the pistol targets.  These might be nine separate targets, or perhaps three targets which the shooter will "sweep" three times.  He then lays his rifle back down on the hay bale with action open and chamber empty and runs to the right where his shotgun is staged.  Since shotguns are always staged open and empty, the shooter will retrieve his gun and load it with a maximum of two rounds (regardless of the type of shotgun) and engage two knock-down targets, reload and engage two more knock-down targets (which must fall to score).  The shooter will then lay his open and empty shotgun back on the hay bale and draw his second revolver. This time the shooter engages three revolver targets in what is known as a "Nevada Sweep" (left, center, right, center, left) for a total of five rounds.

After the competitor is finished shooting, the Range Officer will tell him to take his long guns and go to the unloading table where another shooter will supervise the unloading and verify that the guns are unloaded. The shooter's time is then recorded and any misses or penalties added.  Targets are scored by three observers who count misses.

Major matches
End of Trail – World Championship of Cowboy Action Shooting at Ben Avery Shooting Range, Phoenix, Arizona United States of America (March)

Land Run – United States National Championship of Cowboy Action Shooting at the Oklahoma City Gun Club, Arcadia, Oklahoma, United States of America (October)

Regionals – Western, Four Corners, Midwest, Northwest, Southwest, Southeast, and Northeast

State Championships – Each State holds their own State Championship.

Australia National Championship, Australia and New Zealand have their own state championships as well.

European National Championship – Days of Truth (DOT) usually held in August.

Many countries have their own National Championship including but not limited to: Australia, New Zealand, Canada, Czech Republic, Slovakia, Finland, France, Germany, Norway, Sweden, The Nederlands, Denmark, Italy, Hungary, South Africa, Switzerland, United Kingdom, and Serbia. 

Other major matches of note:

Badlands Bar3 – Comin' Back At Cha

https://www.sassnet.com/AnnualMatches.php

Safety 

Foremost, safety glasses (shooting glasses) must be worn at all times.  In a typical stage the shooter, who is next in line to compete, will load his guns at a loading table under the supervision of a designated loading official.  Western-style "six-shooters" are always loaded with only five rounds with the empty chamber under the hammer.  The shooter's rifle will also be loaded with the requisite number of rounds with the hammer down on an empty chamber.  Shotguns are always left unloaded, then loaded "on the clock".

At a typical Cowboy Action range, ALL guns are kept unloaded except when the shooter prepares at the loading table, shoots the stage, then proceeds to the unloading table to unload the revolvers and prove that all guns are empty. Whether guns are loaded or empty, CAS emphasizes safety. Even with the theme of the Wild West's cowboy attire, all shooters must wear safety glasses while on the firing line in addition to other important safety rules and more than some other shooting sports have. Many of these safety requirements are due to the nature of reproduction single action revolvers with fixed cylinders, and repeating rifles with non-removable tubular magazines.

The Range Officer is responsible for safely conducting the shooter through the stage. The Range Officer's attention is not on the targets but rather on the shooter and his firearms.  One important duty of the Range Officer is to immediately stop the shooter if the shooter's gun or ammunition is defective in any potentially unsafe way.

Themes 

In addition to requiring shooters to wear Old West attire, the western theme of the matches is enhanced by having suitable targets and props for the stages.  For example, a stage may be set in a bank and the shooter will be required to shoot through a barred "teller" window, then perhaps retrieve a "sack of gold" from a safe and carry it in one hand while shooting with his other hand.  Another stage may have a shooter rescuing a baby (doll) and having to carry the "child" through the entire stage while engaging the targets.  Other props may include buckboards, chuck wagons, stagecoaches, and "horses" as well as jail cells, oak barrels, hitching posts, swinging saloon doors, etc.

Prizes 

No money or merchandise prizes are offered in CAS, but often there are drawings and prizes, ensuring a more family-oriented sport.

World records 
Shotgun:

- Lever Shotgun – 4 shots – First Place – 3.13 –  Smokestack, Second Place – 3.29 – Badlands Bud, Third Place – Duece Stevens 3.50

- Hammered Shotgun - 

- Open Shotgun - 

- 1897 Shotgun - 

Rifle:

- Rifle – 10 shots – First Place – 1.57 – Tie – (Deuce Stevens, Smokestack), 3rd Place –  1.63 –  Hell Hound

Pistol:

– Pistol Traditional – First place –  Deuce Stevens 2.38, Second Place Smokestack 2.88, Spencer Hogland 3.11

- Gunfighter Pistol – First Place –  Widow Maker 1.81, Second Place 1.95, Third Place - Dollar Bill 2.05

– Duelist Pistol, First Place – 2.65 Smokestack, Second Place – 2.83 – Straight Arrow Hombre, Third Place – Badlands Bud 4.20

Categories 

All of the below categories may also be shot as lady categories; there is no men's category (all are considered open), and ladies may shoot in open categories.

There are many other categories, especially at the local level, but the below are representative of the main types of categories one finds at cowboy action shooting events.
 Buckaroo/Buckarette: 13 and under
 Junior Boy/Junior Girl: 16 and under
 Cowboy / Cowgirl – Shooters of all ages
 Wrangler/Lady Wrangler: Age 36 and up
 Forty-Niner/Lady Forty-Niner: Age 49 and up
 Senior/Lady Senior: Age 60 and up
 Silver Senior/Lady Silver Senior: Age 65 and up
 Elder Statesman/Grand Dame: Age 70 and up
 Cattle Baron/Cattle Baroness: Age 75 and up
 El Patron/La Patrona: Age 80 and up
 El Rey/La Reina: Age 85 and up
 B-Western – Shooters wear clothing inspired by the B-Western films of the 1930s and 1940s, starring Roy Rogers, William "Hopalong Cassidy" Boyd, and others. "Buscadero" type gunbelt/holster rigs are required, and the shooter must wear spurs.
 Classic Cowboy/Classic Cowgirl – Shooters have specific clothing requirements and shoot Duelist or Double Duelist style using .40 caliber or larger, rimmed cartridges; shotguns must be external hammer double barrel, single shot, or lever actions
 Frontier Cartridge – Shooters use black powder rather than smokeless powder in all their guns
 Frontiersman – Shooters use cap and ball revolvers, shot duelist style, and side-by-side double-barrel or lever-action shotguns
 Wild Bunch – based on popular Western film "The Wild Bunch"; shooters use Colt 1911 pistol instead of revolvers, use lever-action rifles, and use Winchester Model 1897 shotgun instead of double-barreled shotgun.

Categories based on how the shooter fires their guns

 Duelist – Shooter uses only one hand to fire revolvers
 Gunfighter – Shooter uses two revolvers at once when the stage allows, otherwise shoots right-side revolver with right hand only and left-side revolver with left hand only

In addition to percussion (cap and ball) weapons, many firearms are center-fire .32 caliber or larger with revolvers and rifles chambered in .38 Special and .45 Colt being very popular.  Ammunition is generally loaded at medium to full power levels, although many junior shooters or women prefer to shoot lighter calibers (such as .32 and .38).  A noted trend among some shooters is to use light loads to reduce recoil and improve their times. This tends to run contrary to the "Spirit of the Game".

Cowboy mounted shooting 

An offshoot of cowboy action shooting is cowboy mounted shooting, also sometimes called western mounted shooting, or simply mounted shooting. Events require that the contestant ride a horse through a course of fire while carrying the same guns used in cowboy action shooting. The rider shoots up to ten balloon targets. Events use blank ammunition certified to break a target balloon within twenty feet instead of live rounds.

See also 
 List of shooting sports organizations
 Bridgeport rig
 Shooting ranges in the United States

References

External links 
 CowboyActionShooting.com
Organizations
 SASS Single Action Shooting Society
 CAS City
 Cowboy Mounted Shooting
 Mounted Shooters of America
Western 3-Gun
Cowboy Fast Draw Association
World Fast Draw Association

International groups
 CAS Europe
 BDS-Westernschiessen, a division of the Bund Deutscher Sportschützen in Germany

Cowboy culture
Reenactment of the late modern period
Muzzleloading
North American martial arts
Shooting sports
Shooting sports events